Zacharie Lionel Enguene Onana (born 7 January 1996) is a Cameroonian footballer who plays as an attacking midfielder for Olímpic de Xàtiva.

Club career

Barcelona 
Born in Bertoua, Enguene came to FC Barcelona in 2007, through the Samuel Eto'o Foundation at the age of 11. In 2011, he scored 13 goals for the Cadete A team, also acting as the side's captain.

After finishing his graduation, Enguene was promoted to the reserves in July 2015, after the club's relegation to Segunda División B. He made his senior debut 22 August of that year, replacing Sergi Samper for the final 13 minutes of a 1–2 loss at UE Cornellà.

Enguene contributed with 12 appearances (only two starts, however) during the campaign before departing in January 2016.

Antalyaspor 
On 19 January 2016 Enguene joined Antalyaspor in the Turkish Süper Lig. He made his professional debut five days later, starting in a 0–1 away loss against Gençlerbirliği.

Lugo
On 31 August 2016, Enguene signed a three-year deal with Segunda División club CD Lugo. After making no appearances, he was loaned to Leixões S.C. the following 31 January.

Kazma and Telavi
In the summer 2019, Enguene moved to Kuwaiti club Kazma SC. However, on 11 November 2019, it was announced that he had signed with Georgian club FC Telavi.

Career statistics

Honours

Club
Barcelona
 UEFA Youth League: 2013–14

References

External links

Living people
1996 births
People from Bertoua
Cameroonian footballers
Association football midfielders
Segunda División B players
Süper Lig players
Liga Portugal 2 players
FC Barcelona Atlètic players
CD Lugo players
Antalyaspor footballers
Leixões S.C. players
Kazma SC players
Cameroon under-20 international footballers
Cameroonian expatriate footballers
Cameroonian expatriate sportspeople in Spain
Cameroonian expatriate sportspeople in Turkey
Cameroonian expatriate sportspeople in Portugal
Expatriate footballers in Spain
Expatriate footballers in Turkey
Expatriate footballers in Portugal
Expatriate footballers in Kuwait
Expatriate footballers in Georgia (country)
FC Barcelona players
Kuwait Premier League players
Cameroonian expatriate sportspeople in Kuwait